SA-5 may refer to:

 SA-5 Gammon, the NATO reporting name for the Soviet S-200 surface-to-air missile
 SA-5 (Apollo), the first launch of the Block II Saturn I rocket as part of the Apollo Program
 Sigma SA-5, film SLR camera by Sigma Corporation, launched in 1997
 SA-5, a song by American singer Beck from the 1997 Deadweight single